Amoj (also romanized as Amodzh and Amodj) is a village in the Lori Province of Armenia.

References 

Populated places in Lori Province